The BBWAA Career Excellence Award, formerly the J. G. Taylor Spink Award, is the highest award given by the Baseball Writers' Association of America (BBWAA). It is given "for meritorious contributions to baseball writing" and voted on annually by the BBWAA. Winners are typically announced in December, with the award presented during induction festivities of the Baseball Hall of Fame in July. Winners are not considered to be members of the Hall; they are not "inducted" or "enshrined", but are permanently recognized in an exhibit at the Hall's library.

The award was instituted in 1962 and named after J. G. Taylor Spink, publisher of The Sporting News from 1914 to 1962, and the award's first recipient. In February 2021, the BBWAA voted to remove his name from the award "due to Spink’s troubled history in supporting segregated baseball."

Eligibility
The honoree does not have to be a member of the Baseball Writers' Association of America (BBWAA), but every recipient from the award's 1962 inception through 2013 had been a BBWAA member at some time. The first recipient who had never been a BBWAA member was  recipient Roger Angell. Despite having written on baseball for more than a half-century, Angell never worked a specific baseball writing beat, thereby making him ineligible for BBWAA membership.

Veterans Committee role
For several years in the early 2000s, honorees became life members of the Veterans Committee, which elects players whose eligibility for BBWAA consideration has ended, and is also the sole body that elects non-players for induction into the Hall.

Recipients
Through 2006, the BBWAA designated honorees based on the announcement year (typically in December). In the below table, winners through 2006 are listed with both their announcement year, and their induction ceremony year (the ensuing summer). In 2007, the BBWAA changed the year designation for the award to coincide with the induction ceremony. Thus, while the official BBWAA year designations jump from 2006 to 2008, the award has been bestowed annually since inception, except for one year missed due to the 1994–95 Major League Baseball strike.

From 1972 through 1981, there were multiple honorees each year. This again occurred in 1988 and 1992. Since that time, there has been a single winner each year.

Through 2010, the award was presented during the actual induction ceremony; since then, it has been presented at the Hall of Fame awards presentation, held the day before the induction ceremony. In recent years, the Hall of Fame has announced the finalists for the award and final vote totals. Previously, such detail was not made public, with only the winner announced.

Notes
This award should not be confused with the Topps Minor League Player of the Year Award, which was also known as the "J. G. Taylor Spink Award".

See also
Honor Rolls of Baseball (writers section)
Dick McCann Memorial Award, bestowed annually by the Professional Football Writers of America 
U.S. major leagues: Awards by organizations other than MLB
List of sports journalism awards

References

External links
J. G. Taylor Spink Award on Baseball Hall of Fame
J. G. Spink Award on Baseball Almanac

Spink Award
Major League Baseball trophies and awards
American journalism awards
Sports writing awards

+J
Awards established in 1962